Algorfa is a village in the Costa Blanca area of Spain, near the coast and surrounded by Mediterranean pine forest and citrus groves. 

Algorfa lies on the banks of the river Segura and is approximately 10 minutes drive to the nearest blue flag beaches of the Mediterranean and 35;minutes' drive away from Alicante Airport and Murcia-San Javier Airport. It is a 10-minute drive inland from the coastal resort of Guardamar del Segura.

As one of Vega Baja del Segura’s citrus farming villages, with a population of over 3,000, Algorfa is situated within a fertile countryside.

Just outside the village is an unusual neo-gothic church that was built at the beginning of the nineteenth century. Algorfa holds a market on Wednesdays.

It is also home to the La Finca Golf Club.
It also is home to 3 urbanizations. Lo Crispín, Castillo de Montemar  and Montebello. All of which are composed by villas and apartments.

References

Municipalities in the Province of Alicante
Vega Baja del Segura